Cedric Cromwell, also known as Qaqeemasq (or Running Bear) in Wôpanâak, is the Former Tribal Council Chairman of the Mashpee Wampanoag Tribe of Massachusetts.  Elected in 2009 as chairman, Cedric Cromwell was the head of the official elected government for the 2,600-member federally recognized tribe.

Cromwell was removed from office in 2020 after being Federally Indicted

Biography
Cromwell is the son of James Oliver Cromwell of Yarmouth, Nova Scotia and Constance "Lone Eagless" Tobey-Cromwell of Dorchester, Massachusetts. She served as the Wampanoag Tribal Secretary.

Tribal activities
Cromwell was  elected to the Tribal Council and served for eight years before being elected Chairman in 2009. He was elected as part of a reform movement following the resignation of the former chairman, Glenn Marshall, who pleaded guilty on "federal embezzling, mail fraud and election finance charges".

Cromwell has gained financial backing for the tribe's casino development effort from the Malaysian billionaire Lim Goh Tong and his Kien Huat Realty arm of the Genting Group.  The chairman hired the former U.S. representative Bill Delahunt to lobby on behalf of the tribe.

Because the Wampanoag have long been without a reservation, Cromwell is committed to securing federal lands in trust for the tribe. Under state and federal gaming laws, such land is necessary as a sovereign base for the tribal plan to establish a gaming casino resort, with plans to include hotels, restaurants, slot parlors and retail shopping. The previous council chair Glenn Marshall had similar proposals for a Mashpee Wampanoag land-in-trust reservation, including the establishment of an international free-trade zone and Indian wholesale banking operations independent from state and federal regulators.

Cromwell has traveled to Washington, DC, to lobby on Native American issues. He supports the Native CLASS Act to improve education of Native children, and the equal treatment of all Indian tribes by the federal government.  He testified before the Senate Committee on Indian Affairs. He is working to gain Congressional approval for legislation to enable the Wampanoag to acquire land for the government to hold in trust.  But the US Supreme Court decision in Carcieri v. Salazar (2012) ruled that tribes not under federal jurisdiction in 1934 could not acquire land that could be classified as trust land by the Department of Interior. Any land they acquired would be treated in common with other privately held land.

Personal
Cromwell is married to Cheryl Frye-Cromwell.

See also
Deval Patrick#Casino gaming
Genting Group#Resort and casino properties
Bill Delahunt#Lobbying

External links
 Official Mashpee Wampanoag Tribe website.
 Reel Wamps, anonymous blog critical of tribal affairs.
 "More Wampanoag debt, more secrets", WampaLeaks, 4 November 2012, anonymous blog

References

Native American leaders
Living people
1965 births
Roxbury Community College
Mashpee Wampanoag people
Native American people from Massachusetts
20th-century Native Americans
21st-century Native Americans